Hyperno (1973–2002) was a Thoroughbred racehorse foaled in New Zealand. He was a wayward but brilliant galloper that won the Melbourne Cup and other group and listed races.

He was sired by Rangong (GB) out of Mikarla (NZ) by Persian Garden II (GB). He was trained in his early years at Caulfield by Geoff Murphy. A dispute over training methods between Murphy and Hyperno's owners in 1978 led to Bart Cummings taking over as trainer. The winner of a string of group and listed races throughout his career, Hyperno won the 1979 Melbourne Cup with jockey Harry White aboard. In 1981, Hyperno was voted Australian Horse of the Year. Hyperno enjoyed a celebrated retirement at the rural property of his Melbourne Cup rider, Harry White, where he died in 2002.

References
 Melbourne Cup winners

External links
 Hyperno's pedigree and partial racing stats

1973 racehorse births
2002 racehorse deaths
Australian Champion Racehorse of the Year
Melbourne Cup winners
Racehorses bred in New Zealand
Racehorses trained in Australia
Thoroughbred family 2-c